Rachel Zajac is a New Zealand forensic psychologist and professor at the University of Otago in Dunedin.

Academic career 
Zajac graduated from the University of Otago in 2002 with a PhD titled "The effect of cross-examination on the reliability and credibility of children's testimony". She joined the Department of Psychology as a lecturer the following year and was appointed associate professor in 2016. In December 2019 she was promoted to full professor with effect from 1 February 2020.

In March 2015, when a senior lecturer, Zajac won a Teaching Excellence Award presented by the University of Otago and in August 2016 she won a National Tertiary Teaching Excellence Award valued at NZ$20,000.

Zajac has worked as an expert witness and also trained police, judges, lawyers and forensic scientists in the psychological aspects of criminal investigations. Her research focus is on the evidence given by eyewitnesses, how memory is influenced by social conditions and the interpretation of evidence as it is affected by psychological issues.

Select publications

Book chapters 

 Rachel Zajac. "Investigative interviewing in the courtroom: Child witnesses under cross-examination" in  doi: 10.1002/9780470747599.ch10
 Rachel Zajac, "Child sexual abuse complainants under cross-examination: The ball is in our court" in

Journal articles

References 

Living people
Year of birth missing (living people)
University of Otago alumni
Academic staff of the University of Otago
Forensic psychologists